Acronicta alni, the alder moth, is a moth of the family Noctuidae. It is found in Europe (from southern Fennoscandia to Spain, Italy and the Balkans), Turkey, the European part of Russia and the neighbouring countries, the Caucasus, the Ural, southern Siberia, Transbaikalia, the Russian Far East (Primorye, Sakhalin, southern Kuriles, Khabarovsk and the Amur region), China, Japan (Hokkaido and Honshu) and the Korean Peninsula.

Further reading 
South R. (1907) The Moths of the British Isles, (First Series), Frederick Warne & Co. Ltd., London & NY: 359 pp. online

Notes 

 The flight season refers to the British Isles. This may vary in other parts of the range.

External links

Alder moth on UKmoths
Fauna Europaea
Funet
Lepiforum.de
Vlindernet.nl 

Acronicta
Moths of Europe
Moths of Asia
Moths described in 1767
Taxa named by Carl Linnaeus